Sussex County is located in the southern part of the U.S. state of Delaware, on the Delmarva Peninsula. As of the 2020 census, the population was 237,378. The county seat is Georgetown.

The first European settlement in the state of Delaware was founded by the Dutch in 1631 near the present-day town of Lewes on the Atlantic Coast. However, Sussex County was not organized until 1683 under English colonial rule.

Sussex County is included in the Salisbury, MD-DE Metropolitan Statistical Area which encompasses much of central Delmarva.

History

Beginnings
Archaeologists estimate that the first inhabitants of Sussex County, the southernmost county in Delaware, arrived between 10,000 and 14,000 years ago. Various indigenous cultures occupied the area, especially along the river and the coast, often having seasonal fishing villages. Historic Native Americans in Sussex County were members of Algonquian-speaking tribes, as were most coastal peoples along the Atlantic Coast.

By the historic period of European encounter, the most prominent tribes in the area were the Lenape, whose territory extended through the mid-Atlantic states to Connecticut and the future New York metropolitan area, and Nanticoke tribes. The people settled along the numerous bodies of water in the area where they were able to harvest fish, oysters, and other shellfish in the fall and winter. In the warmer months the women planted and cultivated crops, and processed the food. The men hunted deer and other small mammals, as larger game was not present in the area.

European discovery
There is no agreement on which European group was the first to settle in Sussex County. Historians believe that, in the early years of exploration from 1593 to 1630, Swedish explorers were likely the first Europeans to see the Delaware River and the lands of present-day Sussex County.

On an expedition for the Dutch West India Company, Henry Hudson recorded discovery in 1609 of what was later named the Delaware River. Attempting to follow him, Samuel Argall, an English explorer, was blown off course in 1610 and landed in a strange bay which he named after the Governor of Virginia, Thomas West, Lord De La Warr.

In the first half of 1613, Cornelius Jacobsen Mey, a Dutch navigator, discovered and named both Cape May and Cape Henlopen (originally Hindlopen) in the Delaware Bay. Later it was found that what May had named Henlopen was Fenwick Island, protruding into the Atlantic Ocean. The name of the cape was moved to its present location just east of Lewes.

European settlement
Sussex County was the site of the first European settlement in Delaware, a Dutch trading post named Zwaanendael at the present site of Lewes. On June 3, 1631, Dutch captain David Pietersen de Vries landed along the shores of the Delaware to establish a whaling colony in the mid-Atlantic of the New World. The colony lasted only until 1632, when De Vries left. Upon returning to Zwaanendael that December, he found the Indian tribes had killed his men and burned the colony. The Dutch set about settling the area once again.

Although the Dutch and Swedes returned to resettle the Delaware River region as early as 1638, much of the Delaware Bay area south of what is today the city of Newcastle was not settled until 1662. At that time, the city of Amsterdam made a grant of land at the Hoernkills (the area around Cape Henlopen, near the current town of Lewes) to a party of Mennonites. A total of 35 men were to be included in the settlement, led by a Pieter Cornelisz Plockhoy of Zierikzee, and funded by a sizable loan from the city to get them established. This settlement, established in 1663, was organized in part by the Dutch to respond to threats from the English colony of Maryland to the west beginning to assert rights over the area. The English wrested control of New Netherland from the Dutch in 1664 and they destroyed the Mennonite settlement that same year; English reports indicated that “not even a nail” was left there.

Settlement in the area after the English ejected the Dutch was slow. The Swedes and Finns who had settled in the area from the days of New Sweden had generally welcomed the English and were allowed to stay; the few Dutch found in the area were rounded up as prisoners and sent to Virginia as slaves. Lord Baltimore encouraged Marylanders to move east to settle the area. But the land was far removed from other, more established settlements and did not appeal to many new settlers. It was a tempting wilderness base for pirates to hide out from authorities and regularly pillage settlers for supplies.

The Dutch briefly recaptured the territory in 1673 as part of the Third Anglo-Dutch War. At that point, they established courts in the town of New Castle and at the Hoerkill at the southern end of the territory, effectively creating two counties out of the territory. After the war concluded in 1674, the Delaware territory was returned to the English. It was then placed under the control of James Stuart, Duke of York.

In 1680, the Duke reorganized the territory south of the Mispillion River as Deale County with the county seat at New Deale (modern-day Lewes); and created a third county, St. Jones, out of the Delaware territory between the Mispillion River and Duck Creek.  In 1682, English King Charles II awarded the Delaware territories to William Penn in settlement of family debts, and Penn reorganized all three Delaware counties: Deale County become Sussex County, and St. Jones County became Kent County, in recognition of Penn's homelands in the county of Sussex, England. He brought 200 people from Sussex, England as colonists.  The town of New Deale was renamed Lewistown (today known as Lewes). At this time, Penn claimed that the Delaware territory extended as far south as Fenwick Island. The 'Three Lower Counties' (Delaware) along Delaware Bay were considered under Penn's sphere of settlement and became the Delaware Colony, a satellite of Pennsylvania.

But the boundary disputes continued between Pennsylvania and Maryland. Charles Calvert, 5th Baron Baltimore and William Penn both claimed the land between the 39th and 40th parallels, according to the charters granted to each colony. Whereas Penn claimed the Delaware territories extended to Fenwick Island, Calvert claimed the Maryland Colony ended at Lewes, with all the land south of the settlement belonging to Somerset County.

In 1732 Charles Calvert signed a territorial agreement with William Penn's sons that drew a line somewhere in between the two colonies and renounced Calvert's claim to Delaware. But Lord Baltimore later claimed that the document he signed did not contain the terms he had agreed to, and refused to put the agreement into effect. Beginning in the mid-1730s, violence erupted between settlers claiming various loyalties to Maryland and Pennsylvania. The border conflict between Pennsylvania and Maryland would be known as Cresap's War.

In 1750–1751, a team of surveyors from both colonies surveyed and marked the Transpeninsular Line, which established the southern boundary of Sussex County. However, residents of the disputed territory continued to pay taxes to Maryland into the 1770s.

The issue was unresolved until the Crown intervened in 1760, ordering Frederick Calvert, 6th Baron Baltimore to accept the 1732 agreement. As part of the settlement, the Penns and Calverts commissioned the English team of Charles Mason and Jeremiah Dixon to survey the newly established boundaries between the Province of Pennsylvania, the Province of Maryland, Delaware Colony and parts of Colony and Old Dominion of Virginia.

Between 1763 and 1767, Charles Mason and Jeremiah Dixon surveyed the Mason-Dixon line, settling Sussex County's western borders. After Pennsylvania abolished slavery in 1781, the western part of this line and the Ohio River became a border between free and slave states. Although Delaware remained a slave state, it already had a number of free blacks, and slaveholders manumitted more slaves in the first two decades after the Revolution.

The resolution of the boundary dispute enlarged Sussex County considerably, and the new territory was nicknamed New Sussex.

In 1769 a movement started to move the county seat from Lewes to the area then known as Cross Roads, the present day site of Milton. The current county seat of Georgetown was settled upon on January 27, 1791, after residents in western Sussex County successfully petitioned the Delaware General Assembly to move the county seat to a central location, as the limited roads at the time made it too difficult for outlying residents to reach the county seat in Lewes.

Georgetown was not a previously established town. Eventually the town was laid out in a circle one mile (1.6 km) across. It was centered on the original square surveyed by Shankland, which is now listed on the National Register of Historic Places. Georgetown was named after Senate President George Mitchell.

Sussex County has been known by several names over the years, including Susan County, Hoorenkill or Whorekill County as named by the Dutch prior to 1680 when Kent County broke off. From 1680 to 1682 it was known as Deale County, after being taken over by the British under James Stuart, Duke of York prior to signing over to William Penn. It was called Durham County when claimed by the Lords Baltimore during the boundary dispute with the Penn family.

Geography

It is the largest county in Delaware by area. The county's land area comprises 48.0 percent of the state's land area. It is the second-highest percentage of territory of a state of any county in the United States.

Sussex County, like all of Delaware's counties, is subdivided into Hundreds. There are several explanations given for how the Hundreds were determined: as an area containing 100 families, an area containing 100 people, or an area that could raise 100 soldiers. Sussex County is apportioned into eleven Hundreds: Cedar Creek, Broadkill, Georgetown, Nanticoke, Northwest Fork, Broad Creek, Little Creek, Dagsboro, Baltimore, Indian River, and Lewes & Rehoboth.

The eastern portion of the county is home to Delaware's beaches on the Atlantic Coast and many seaside resorts.  The western side of the county is the center of Delaware's agriculture, industry with more acres of arable land under cultivation than anywhere else in the state.

Sussex County is home to an extensive system of Southern saltwater and freshwater wetlands, notably the Great Cypress Swamp.  This massive freshwater swamp contains the northernmost strand of Bald Cypress trees in the United States.

Prime Hook National Wildlife Refuge is a  along the western shore of Delaware Bay. The refuge contains a variety of habitats, including freshwater and salt marshes, woodlands, grasslands, ponds, and forested areas, supporting 267 species of birds and a variety of reptiles, amphibians and mammals.

Adjacent counties
Kent County – north
Cape May County, New Jersey – northeast
Worcester County, Maryland – south
Dorchester County, Maryland – southwest
Wicomico County, Maryland – southwest
Caroline County, Maryland – northwest

Major highways

National protected area
 Prime Hook National Wildlife Refuge

Climate
Sussex County has a humid subtropical climate (Cfa) according to the Köppen climate classification. The Trewartha climate classification only has the area along the Atlantic Coast up to Cape Henlopen and Lewes as Cf and the remainder of the county as Do (oceanic.) Three months average above , all months average above freezing, and seven to eight months average above . The hardiness zones are 7a and 7b.

Government
Unlike Northern Delaware, particularly New Castle County, Sussex County is highly conservative. Sussex County has only supported a Democrat for president three times since 1944.

This was the only county in Delaware that Barack Obama did not carry in either of his presidential bids, despite the presence of Delawarean Joe Biden on the ballot. Biden himself lost the county by 11 points in his own successful bid for president in 2020. Strangely, while Sussex County rejected the Obama-Biden ticket in 2008, Biden carried it in his simultaneous 2008 Senate run (he carried it in six of his seven successful Senate campaigns), meaning some voters in this county rejected Biden at the top of the ballot while simultaneously supporting him at the bottom of the ballot.

The county's Republican bent is no less pronounced at the state level. Republicans hold every seat on the county council and every elected county office. Republicans also hold all five state senate seats and all but one state house seat within the county.

|}

Sussex County's government is composed of an elected county council and various elective executive heads of departments. The county council has five members, who serve four-year terms; all are elected from single-member districts. They form the legislative authority of the county, and choose a "County Administrator" or executive.

The county council members are Council President Michael H. Vincent (R, District 1), Samuel R. Wilson Jr. (R, District 2), Vice President Irwin G. Burton III (R, District 3), Douglas B. Hudson (R, District 4), and John L. Rieley (R, District 5).

The additional offices of Clerk of the Peace, Register of Deeds, Register of Wills and Sheriff are elected at-large.  These positions are held by Norman A. Jones Jr. (R), Scott Dailey (R), Cynthia Green (R), and Robert Lee (R), respectively.

Sussex County is split between five state senate districts and nine state house districts.

State Senate:

District 6  – Ernesto Lopez (R)
District 18 – David L. Wilson (R)
District 19 – Brian G. Pettyjohn (R)
District 20 – Gerald Hocker (R)
District 21 – Bryant Richardson (R)

State House of Representatives:

District 14 – Peter C. Schwartzkopf (D)
District 20 – Stephen Smyk (R)
District 35 – Jesse Vanderwende (R)
District 36 – Bryan Shupe (R)
District 37 – Ruth Briggs King (R)
District 38 – Ronald E. Gray (R)
District 39 – Daniel Short (R)
District 40 – Timothy Dukes (R)
District 41 – Richard Collins (R)

Demographics

The county has been growing, with the population in 2010 at 197,145 and estimated for 2013 at 210,489. The racial makeup is estimated for 2013 at 82.5% White, 12.9% Black or African American, 1.3% Native American, 1.2% Asian, .1% Pacific Islander, 2.1% from two or more races. 9.2% of the population were Hispanic or Latino of any race.

2000 census
As of the census of 2000, there were 156,638 people, 62,577 households, and 43,866 families residing in the county. There were 93,070 housing units at an average density of 99 per square mile (38/km2). The racial makeup of the county was 80.35% White, 14.89% Black or African American, 0.60% Native American, 0.75% Asian, 0.04% Pacific Islander, 2.02% from other races, and 1.35% from two or more races. 4.41% of the population were Hispanic or Latino of any race. 14.9% were of English, 14.3% United States or American (Mostly British), 12.9% Irish, 12.5% German and 5.6% Italian ancestry, 93.3% spoke English and 4.3% Spanish as their first language.

There were 62,577 households, out of which 27.10% had children under the age of 18 living with them, 54.90% were married couples living together, 11.30% had a female householder with no husband present, and 29.90% were non-families. 24.30% of all households were made up of individuals, and 11.10% had someone living alone who was 65 years of age or older. The average household size was 2.45 and the average family size was 2.88.

In the county, the population was spread out, with 22.50% under the age of 18, 7.00% from 18 to 24, 26.30% from 25 to 44, 25.60% from 45 to 64, and 18.50% who were 65 years of age or older. The median age was 41 years. For every 100 females, there were 95.50 males. For every 100 females age 18 and over, there were 92.80 males.

The median income for a household in the county was $39,208, and the median income for a family was $45,203. Males had a median income of $30,811 versus $23,625 for females. The per capita income for the county was $20,328. About 7.70% of families and 10.50% of the population were below the poverty line, including 15.00% of those under age 18 and 8.40% of those age 65 or over.

Eastern parts of Sussex County, particularly the Cape Region, tend to be more affluent than western portions of the county, with a median household income of $77,030 in 2009.

2010 census
As of the 2010 census, there were 197,145 people, 79,368 households, and 53,698 families residing in the county. The racial makeup of the county was 79.0% white, 12.7% black or African American, 1.0% Asian, 0.8% American Indian, 0.1% Pacific islander, 4.1% from other races, and 2.3% from two or more races. Those of Hispanic or Latino origin made up 8.6% of the population. In terms of ancestry, 17.9% were Irish, 17.8% were German, 15.9% were English, 7.0% were Italian, and 6.2% were American.

Of the 79,368 households, 27.0% had children under the age of 18 living with them, 51.3% were married couples living together, 11.7% had a female householder with no husband present, 32.3% were non-families, and 25.6% of all households were made up of individuals. The average household size was 2.45 and the average family size was 2.89. The median age was 45.4 years.

The median income for a household in the county was $51,046 and the median income for a family was $59,053. Males had a median income of $41,978 versus $32,148 for females. The per capita income for the county was $26,779. About 8.0% of families and 11.7% of the population were below the poverty line, including 20.4% of those under age 18 and 6.5% of those age 65 or over.

Economy

Most of Sussex County's economy revolves around agriculture. In fact, Sussex County produces the most poultry of any county in the United States.

Tourism also plays a large part of the economy, particularly in eastern Sussex County. According to SeaGrant Delaware, the Delaware Beaches generate $6.9 billion annually and over $711 million in tax revenue.

The average home and property price in Sussex County increased 250% in the ten years between 1995 and 2005.  Local increases within Sussex County for this period include a 381% increase for Millsboro and a 609% increase for Millville. Sussex County is served by the Delmarva Central Railroad and the Maryland and Delaware Railroad.

Education

Public

Sussex County is served by eight public school districts.
 Cape Henlopen School District
 Delmar School District
 Indian River School District
 Laurel School District
 Milford School District (also serves Kent County)
 Seaford School District
 Woodbridge School District (also serves Kent County)
 Sussex Technical School District (County-wide overlay school district)

The county also contains one charter school, the Sussex Academy of Arts & Sciences.

Those state funded public high schools which participate in sporting events are members of the Henlopen Conference.

Private
There are several private schools in Sussex County: Bible Center Christian Academy (Laurel), Children Craft CO (Seaford), Delmarva Christian High School (Georgetown, Destiny Christian School (Georgetown), Eagle's Nest Christian School (Milton), Epworth Christian School (Laurel), Greenwood Mennonite School (Greenwood), Harbor Christian Academy (Ellendale), The Jefferson School (Georgetown), Jesus Is Lord Christian Academy (Georgetown), Lighthouse Christian School (Dagsboro), Lighted Pathway Christian Academy (Seaford), Milford Christian School (Milford) and Seaford Christian Academy (Seaford).

Higher education
There are several colleges and universities in Sussex County. Delaware Technical Community College has the largest presence in the county, but students can also attend Delaware State University, Goldey-Beacom College, University of Delaware, Wesley College all in Georgetown, the Philadelphia Bible College in Ellendale, and the Beebe Hospital School of Nursing in Lewes.  The University of Delaware also maintains a marine science campus in Lewes.

Culture
The culture in Sussex County is much like that found in other Delmarva counties.  Sussex County is starkly different from the rest of the Mid-Atlantic and is much like that of the Southern United States.
Sussex County is driven by agriculture and commercial fishing. Most of the land is rural and there are but a few large population centers. Many local restaurants serve southern cuisine such as sweet tea and dishes including or composed entirely of greens in addition to menus heavy with fried food.

Many dialectic studies show that Sussex County residents, much like surrounding Delmarva counties, have a variation of Southern American English which is particularly prevalent in rural areas.

Festivals, fairs, and events
Sussex County, Delaware is home to several festivals, fairs, and events. Some of the more notable festivals are the Bethany Beach Jazz Funeral to mark the end of summer, Apple Scrapple Festival in Bridgeville, the Return Day Parade held after elections in even-numbered years in Georgetown, the Laurel Independence Day Celebration, the Nanticoke Indian Pow Wow in Oak Orchard, the Rehoboth Beach Chocolate Festival, the Rehoboth Beach Independent Film Festival, the Rehoboth Beach Jazz Festival, the Sea Witch Halloween Festival and Parade in Rehoboth Beach, and Seaford Riverfest.  Also, Sussex County is the home of the Senior League Softball World Series in Roxana at the Lower Sussex Little League Field. The World Championship Punkin Chunkin was held in Sussex County.

Media

Newspapers
 Cape Gazette
 Coastal Point, Ocean View
 Delaware Coast Press, Rehoboth Beach
 Delaware Wave, Bethany Beach
 Hoy en Delaware, Georgetown
 Laurel Star, Laurel
 Leader & State Register, Seaford
 Seaford Star, Seaford
 Sussex Countian
 Sussex Post, Georgetown
 The Script, Georgetown (published at various times throughout the school year, stories by DelTech students majoring in communications)

Radio

Television
 Sussex County is officially classified as being part of the Salisbury television market. However, due to the association with the Philadelphia and Baltimore metropolitan areas, their channels are usually available on cable and sometimes provide news coverage.
 WBOC, Salisbury, CBS & Fox
 WDPB, Seaford, PBS
 WMDT, Salisbury, ABC & The CW
 WRDE-LD, Salisbury, NBC and MyTV
 WBAL, Baltimore, NBC
 WJZ, Baltimore, CBS
 WCAU, Philadelphia, NBC
 WTXF, Philadelphia, Fox

Communities

Cities
Lewes
Milford (partly in Kent County)
Rehoboth Beach
Seaford

Towns

Bethany Beach
Bethel
Blades
Bridgeville
Dagsboro
Delmar
Dewey Beach
Ellendale
Fenwick Island
Frankford
Georgetown
Greenwood
Henlopen Acres
Laurel
Millsboro
Millville
Milton
Ocean View
Selbyville
Slaughter Beach
South Bethany

Unincorporated communities
Gumboro
Harbeson
Lincoln (a census-designated place)
Long Neck (a census-designated place)
Oak Orchard
Reliance (partial)
Roxana

See also

National Register of Historic Places listings in Sussex County, Delaware
Slaughter Creek (Cedar Creek tributary)

References

External links
 Official website
Official Auction of Sussex County

 

 
1683 establishments in Delaware
Delaware counties
Salisbury metropolitan area
Populated places established in 1683